Midnight Ride is a 1990 American action thriller film with slasher elements directed by Bob Bralver. It stars Michael Dudikoff, Mark Hamill, Savina Gersak, and Robert Mitchum.

Plot
After a heated argument with her military police turned cop husband, Lawson (Michael Dudikoff); Russian immigrant house wife, Lara (Savina Gersak) storms off into the night convinced he's more married to his job than her. On her drive to a friend's house, she takes pity on a mournful hitchhiker Justin Mckay (Mark Hamill), desperately searching for a ride. Her offer of a lift to him plunges her into a night of pure terror as Justin is seriously disturbed, twisted by a tortured childhood which ended in being made to see his little sister's shocking murder and mutilation at the hands of his brutal alcoholic mother (who took a butcher knife to her head and used it like a comb) who systematically slays anyone who harms or offends him on a murderous impulse, as he captures their dying moments on his Polaroid camera.

As Lawson struggles to follow Lara despite a leg in a cast, he is left for dead by Justin, but recovers and now must search the steadily darkening roads for Lara, while her deeply troubled captor Justin continues his uncontrollable slaughter-spree, rampaging through the night leaving behind carnage and fiery devastation on his path of madness. As soon as Justin and Lara reach the hospital, Justin pretends Lara is paranoid and soon encounter Dr. Hardy, Justin's doctor who tried to help Justin when he first met him. While Lawson arrives at the hospital, Justin forces Dr. Hardy to give Lara the treatment of electric shocks. As much as Dr. Hardy tries to persuade Justin not to, he ignores him and gives Lara electric shocks, thus trying to kill her. Lawson comes right out of a ventilation shaft into the room stopping Justin from his insane doing and pursues him down to the engineers room tackling Justin down and throwing him right into a current, electrifying him to death.

Lawson and Lara in the end head to the elevator, which Lawson forgives Lara and says that she is more important than his work. Not realizing that Justin survived the incident and secretly dresses up as a patient and is in the elevator with them and grabs a knife to kill them both, but Lawson grabs his gun and shots him directly to the head leading him to his real death, thus ending the film.

Cast

 Michael Dudikoff as Lawson, Lara's Husband
 Mark Hamill as Justin McKay
 Savina Gersak as Lara, Lawson's Wife
 Robert Mitchum as Dr. Hardy
 Pamela Ludwig as Rental Agent
 Timothy Brown as Jordan
 Lezlie Deane as Joan
 Steve Ingrassia as Man With Joan
 Cynthia Szigeti as Mrs. Egan
 Dee Dee Rescher as The Receptionist 
 R. A. Rondell as Officer Baker
 Mark A. Pierce as Policeman

Release
The film was released on July 20, 1990 in the United States.

Reception
The film has a cult following for Mark Hamill's performance as Justin McKay.

See also
Slasher film
Thriller film
Child abuse
Spree killer

External links

1990 films
1990 action thriller films
1990s English-language films
1990s slasher films
American action thriller films
American slasher films
Golan-Globus films
1990s American films
Films scored by Carlo Maria Cordio